San Andrés Teotilalpam  is a town and municipality in Oaxaca in south-western Mexico. The municipality covers an area of 102.07 km². 
It is part of Cuicatlán District in the north of the Cañada Region.

As of 2005, the municipality had a total population of 4255.

References

Municipalities of Oaxaca